Moscow Municipal Society of Philatelists was a regional philatelic organisation in the Soviet Union established in Moscow in 1957.

History 
The first Soviet philatelic organisation, Moscow Society of Philatelists and Collectors, was founded in 1918 in Moscow, and the All-Russian Society of Philatelists was established in 1923. 

In the 1940s, because of the Great Patriotic War, the organised philatelic movement in the USSR ceased. Only in separate cities, there were circles and clubs. In the 1950s, philatelic associations began appearing in many cities around the country.

The Moscow Municipal Society of Collectors, nowadays the Union of Moscow Philatelists, was created in 1957. In 1963, it started publishing the annual Sovetskii Kollektsioner (Soviet Collector).

In March 1966, the All-Union Society of Philatelists was founded. It evolved from the Moscow Municipal Society of Collectors and a range of philatelic associations in other cities of the country. These associations became regional members of the All-Union Society of Philatelists, subsequently the Union of Philatelists of the USSR. The latter functioned until 1992.

See also 
 All-Russian Society of Philatelists
 Filateliya
 First All-Union Philatelic Exhibition
 Kollektsioner
 Leniniana (philately)
 Organisation of the Commissioner for Philately and Scripophily
 Philatelic International
 Soviet Philatelic Association
 Soviet Philatelist

References

Further reading 
  Archived from the original and another source on 2015-05-15.

External links 
 

Philately of the Soviet Union
1957 establishments in the Soviet Union
1966 disestablishments in the Soviet Union
Philatelic organizations
Organizations based in Moscow
Non-profit organizations based in Russia
Culture in Moscow
Defunct organizations based in Russia